Covered is a compilation album of cover versions, released digitally only in August 2011 by Australian rock band, Cold Chisel.
It reached the top 100 on the ARIA Albums Chart, and peaked at number 11 on the iTunes chart.

Track listing

References

2011 albums
Covers albums
Cold Chisel albums
Self-released albums